Gol Makan (also Romanized as Gol Makān and Golmakān; also known as Golmeh Gān, Kalmakān, Kol Makān, and Kul-Makan) is a village in Howmeh Rural District, in the Central District of Khodabandeh County, Zanjan Province, Iran. At the 2006 census, its population was 149, in 32 families.

References 

Populated places in Khodabandeh County